Taranteconus is a synonym of Conus (Stephanoconus) Mörch, 1852. This was a genus of sea snails, marine gastropod mollusks in the family Conidae, the cone snails and their allies.

Species
 Taranteconus chiangi Azuma, 1972: synonym of  Conus chiangi (Azuma, 1972)
 Taranteconus polongimarumai (Kosuge, 1980): synonym of Conus polongimarumai Kosuge, 1980

References

External links
 To World Register of Marine Species

Conidae